Niamh Sharkey is an author and illustrator of children’s picturebooks.

Life
Sharkey started out as freelance illustrator and designer in Dublin after graduating with a degree in visual communication from the Dublin College of Marketing and Design. She was living in Hobart, Tasmania when she illustrated her first full colour picture book. Since then she has gone on to be Laureate na nÓg in Ireland as well as win multiple awards including the Mother Goose Award, The Bisto Book of the Year and the Junior Book of the Year award at The Irish Book Awards. In 2019 Sharkey won the 2019 Children’s Books Ireland/Tyrone Guthrie Centre bursary. Her creation Henry Hugglemonster has been turned into an animated preschool series for Disney Television Animation. Her books have been translated into twenty languages. Sharkey is a member of Illustrators Ireland.

Bibliography
 On The Road With Mavis And Marge
 Cinderella
 I'm A Happy Hugglewug
 Santasaurus
 The Ravenous Beast
 Tales From Old Ireland
 Jack And The Beanstalk
 The Gigantic Turnip
 Tales of Wisdom & Wonder
 Irish Legends For The Very Young

References and sources

21st-century Irish women writers
21st-century Irish writers
Irish children's writers
Irish women children's writers
Year of birth missing (living people)
Irish illustrators
Irish women illustrators
Living people
Laureates na nÓg